The Olkaria VII Geothermal Power Station, also known as the Olkaria VII Geothermal Power Plant, is a proposed geothermal power station in Kenya. The feasibility studies which will inform the design and generation capacity of this renewable energy infrastructure is ongoing, as of March 2022. The proposed generation capacity ranges from 83 megawatts, to 140 megawatts. The plant is owned and under development by Kenya Electricity Generating Company (KenGen), the electricity generation parastatal in Kenya.

Location

Overview
In 2020 Kenya had total installed generation capacity of 2,840 megawatts. Of that, 863.1 megawatts (30.4 percent), were derived from geothermal sources. Olkaria VII helps the country increase its generation capacity to 5,000MW by 2030 and also increases the geothermal content towards the 50 percent goal by  the same date.

Developers
Olkaria VII is under development by the Kenyan parastatal, KenGen, who owns the project.

See also

List of power stations in Kenya
Geothermal power in Kenya
Olkaria I Geothermal Power Station
Olkaria II Geothermal Power Station
Olkaria III Geothermal Power Station
Olkaria IV Geothermal Power Station
Olkaria V Geothermal Power Station

References

External links
How Kenya is harnessing the immense heat from the Earth As of 4 March 2021.
 Kenya’s Drive for Renewables-Powered Development a Vanguard for African Energy Ambitions, says Middle East Energy Dubai Organiser As of 1 March 2022.

Geothermal power stations in Kenya
Nakuru County
Proposed energy infrastructure
Buildings and structures in Kenya